José Luis López Ramírez (born March 31, 1981) is a Costa Rican footballer.

Club career
López made his professional debut for Herediano on 4 January 1997 against Saprissa and left them for Saprissa in 2003.

With Saprissa he has already won five national championships, a UNCAF Cup and a CONCACAF Champions Cup title, in less than four years, and was part of the team that played the 2005 FIFA Club World Championship Toyota Cup, where Saprissa finished third behind São Paulo and Liverpool.

López joined the Australian club Melbourne Victory in July 2008 on a two-year loan deal, after the club managed to free up a space for another international player following left-back Joseph Keenan's release by mutual consent. López made his debut for Melbourne Victory against Perth Glory in the 2008–09 A-League Pre-Season Cup on Saturday, July 26, 2008, with Melbourne winning the game 1–0 through a Michael Thwaite header. He returned to Saprissa in summer 2009.

In March 2010, López joined Chinese club Dalian Shide as a replacement of Zhao Xuri, who left the club for Xi'an Chanba. In July 2011, López moved to the newly promoted Costa Rican Primera División club Belén Siglo XXI on a free transfer and in August 2013 he signed for Uruguay de Coronado.

International career
Commonly known as Puppy or Pupy, he has been an important player for the Costa Rica national football team at numerous levels, playing and captained in the under 20 2001 FIFA World Youth Championship held in Argentina, as well as representing the country with the U-23 team at the 2004 Summer Olympics. held in Athens.

He has also been capped 34 times for the full national team, making his debut in a friendly against the United States on September 7, 2003, playing for the team during 2006 FIFA World Cup and 2010 FIFA World Cup Qualifying.

López Ramírez made three appearances at the 2005 CONCACAF Gold Cup.

Honours
With Melbourne Victory:
 A-League Championship: 2008–2009
 A-League Premiership: 2008–2009

References

External links
 

1981 births
Living people
Footballers from San José, Costa Rica
Association football midfielders
Costa Rican footballers
Costa Rica international footballers
Footballers at the 2004 Summer Olympics
Olympic footballers of Costa Rica
2005 CONCACAF Gold Cup players
C.S. Herediano footballers
Deportivo Saprissa players
Melbourne Victory FC players
Dalian Shide F.C. players
Belén F.C. players
Costa Rican expatriate footballers
Expatriate soccer players in Australia
Costa Rican expatriate sportspeople in China
Expatriate footballers in China
Liga FPD players
Chinese Super League players
A-League Men players
Costa Rican expatriate sportspeople in Australia